Podchernikoff is a surname. Notable people with the surname include:

Alexis Angelo Podchernikoff (1912-1987), American lithographer
Alexis Matthew Podchernikoff (1886-1933), American painter